Lanzetta is a surname. Notable people with the surname include:

 Ignatius Lanzetta (1903–?), American gangster
 James J. Lanzetta (1894–1956), American attorney and politician
 Leo Lanzetta (1895–1925), American gangster
 Margaret Lanzetta (born 1957), American artist
 Maria Carmela Lanzetta (born 1955), Italian politician
 Peppe Lanzetta (born 1956), Italian actor

See also
 The Lanzetta Brothers, gang
 Salvatore Lanzetti (c.1710 – c.1780), Italian cellist and composer

Italian-language surnames